The third USS Calypso (AG-35) was launched 6 January 1932 for the United States Coast Guard as USCGC Calypso (WPC-104) by the Bath Iron Works in Bath, Maine. She was initially stationed at San Diego, California and transferred to Baltimore, Maryland in 1938. She was transferred from the Coast Guard to the U.S. Navy on 17 May 1941 and commissioned the same day.

Calypso was based at the Washington Navy Yard as a tender to her sister ship, the presidential yacht . In this capacity, her operations were confined largely to the Potomac River and Chesapeake Bay until 22 July 1941, when she put out for a cruise to Nova Scotia. During a portion of this cruise she had on board President Franklin D. Roosevelt, bound for the famous Atlantic Conference in Argentia Bay, Newfoundland, with Prime Minister Winston Churchill of the United Kingdom. Her other movements were to provide cover for the president's travels. Returning to Washington, D.C. on 23 August, Calypso was decommissioned 20 January 1942 and returned to the Coast Guard.

Calypso served as a Coast Guard-crewed cutter on the Eastern Sea Frontier defending the East Coast from German submarine attacks on merchant shipping and stationed at Norfolk, Virginia.  She rescued 42 people from SS Buarque and 54 people from Arbutan in February and March 1942. On 15 September 1943 she rescued 60 sailors from the torpedoed patrol vessel  despite heavy seas and sharks. The Coast Guard subsequently decommissioned her on 18 July 1947.

In 1955, Calypso was acquired by Circle Line Sightseeing Cruises of Manhattan, New York and converted into a tour boat. She was renamed Circle Line XI and provided river-based tours of New York City for over 50 years before being retired in 2008.  She was replaced by a new vessel named Circle Line Manhattan.

Citations

References used
 
 
 
 
 
  
 

 

World War II auxiliary ships of the United States
Ships built in Bath, Maine
1932 ships
Ferries of New York City